Ethel Mary Wood CBE (29 June 1877 - 29 June 1970) was an advertising executive, feminist campaigner, philanthropist, bible collector, and the daughter of Quintin Hogg, a businessman and philanthropist who established the Regent Street Polytechnic (now University of Westminster), the largest London-based adult education provider of its day. Wood inherited her father’s strong religious convictions and philanthropy, serving with the London War Pensions Committee, the Winter Distress League, various women’s organisations, and as governor of her father’s Polytechnic.

Biography
Ethel Mary Hogg was born in London, on 29 June 1877 to Quintin Hogg and his wife Alice Anna. Both her brother and Douglas McGarel Hogg, and her nephew, Quintin McGarel Hogg, would go on to hold important government offices. She married Herbert (Bertie) Frederick Wood, a captain in the British army, in 1907.

Wood was an organizer for the Soldiers’ and Sailors’ Family Association (SSFA), and when World War I broke out she became manager of the London office of the Association. After the war, she acted effectively as the chief executive officer of the newly created London War Pensions Committee, running the roughly 700 men and women helping in general welfare efforts for disabled men, children, wives, widows, and families of soldiers and sailors. For this work she was made a C.B.E. in 1920.

Wood's husband, who had survived the war, died of influenza in 1918 and she became a single mother to her daughter Clemency Meara. She joined various feminist causes and business ventures, and was appointed to the board of directors of the advertising agency Samson Clark & Co., later owning 20% of the company. She also chaired the Ministry of Labour's domestic service committee in 1923, and the executive committee of the Winter Distress League, and was a member of the Food Council, setting on an advisory committee to the Milk Marketing Board. She left advertising in 1928 however, becoming involved with the Institute of Scientific Management, and became General Secretary of the British-based Management Research Group in 1932. She wrote two books on her father's Polytechnic in 1932 and 1934, joined the governing body in 1945, and wrote a history of the organization in 1965.

Among her work for feminist causes, she was a founding member and honorary secretary of the Women’s Provisional Club (WPC) for business and professional women, secretary of the British Federation of Business and Professional Women’s Clubs where she worked closely with Caroline Haslett, and honorary secretary of the Committee on Woman Power. She also wrote supporting the cause, including Mainly for Men (1943), which argued that "the war crisis has simply underlined the archaic attitude towards women and the deliberate restriction of opportunities in many fields of activity" and Pilgrimage of Perseverance (1949), a history of the women's emancipation movement.

Wood lectured annually on the English Bible, now known as the Ethel M. Wood lecture. She started collecting Bibles in earnest in 1936. Her notebook records the purchase of a 1550 edition of Coverdale’s Bible as follows: "This was my first old Bible, bought purely out of interest, but the joy & benefit I found in studying it inspired me with the desire to possess a copy of every English translation & so started my 'collection'."

Over the next fourteen years Wood acquired an impressive library of English Bibles and books on biblical studies, through purchase (from the likes of Foyles, Sotheby’s and Maggs), gift (from, for example, the bibliographer Tim Munby), and chance (she found a 1592 Geneva Bible at Roehampton Priory). Wood acquired several exceptional volumes formerly owned by the famous Bible collector Francis Fry through the 1937 Sotheby’s sale of the library of H. H. Gibbs, Lord Aldenham, and her notebook records, with evident satisfaction, how much less she paid for them than Gibbs. In 1950 Wood generously deposited her collection in Senate House Library. Supplemented by additional volumes, her donation became a bequest upon her death in 1970.

She died in London, on 29 June 1970.

References

1877 births
1970 deaths
Commanders of the Order of the British Empire
Collectors from London
Philanthropists from London
Businesspeople from London
English feminists
Converts to Christian Science
English Christian Scientists
English philanthropists
English people of Scottish descent
Ethel
Women's rights activists
People associated with the University of Westminster
English book and manuscript collectors